As of 2015, the A-050 ekranoplan is being developed by the Central Hydrofoil Design Bureau, two concepts of which have been shown at the MAKS Air Show. At the same time, it is thought the ground effect vehicle will be armed with cruise missiles.

References

ekranoplans
Proposed aircraft of Russia